Sa Bangji (사방지,舍方知) was a Korean intersex person during the Joseon Dynasty.

Biography
Sa Bangji had hypospadias and reared as a feminine gender role. Sa learned sewing from their mother. Sa Bangji had sexual relationships with widows and Bhikkhunis. In 1462, the Veritable Records of the Joseon Dynasty recorded that Sa Bangji, a slave, had an affair with a widowed noblewoman.

Cultural depictions
A film based on Bangji's life was produced in South Korea in 1988 named Sa Bangji.

See also
Im Seong-gu

References

15th-century Korean people
Intersex people
Sex scandals
Intersex in history